"Trapped in a Box" is the debut single of American rock band No Doubt. It was released on February 25, 1992, from their debut album No Doubt. Despite failing to chart on the US Billboard Hot 100, it was included on their greatest hits album The Singles 1992–2003.

Background
Within the booklet of The Singles 1992–2003 is a blurb on each song. The short paragraph on "Trapped in a Box" states:

The song is based on a poem that guitarist Tom Dumont wrote about being addicted to television and how it can control one's way of thinking. 19.5degs described the song as "skiffling" and "the weakest track [on The Singles 1992-2003] in the way of singing, but [with] smart lyrics". Music OMH, however, described the song as a "kooky, almost novelty single" and CD Universe described the song as a "rhythmic workout". Rhapsody, in a positive review, described it as "one of the album's highlights" and Allmusic called it "as exciting" as two of No Doubt's more successful singles, "Hella Good" and "Just a Girl".

Music video
After the disappointing sales of No Doubt, Interscope did not wish to finance the release of a single from the record. However, the band financed the shooting of a video for the song "Trapped in a Box" out of their own pockets. Roughly $5,000 was spent on it. The video got local airplay in Orange County. It was also aired on MTV, but it was never aired on VH1, although it was played on MuchMusic in Canada. It failed to achieve status on any chart. In 2003 the song was released on No Doubt's greatest hits compilation album The Singles 1992-2003 and the video was released on the companion DVD of music videos, The Videos 1992–2003.

This is the only music video to feature original keyboardist Eric Stefani, who left in 1994. The video was directed by Mike Zykoff.

Track listing
CD single
 "Trapped in a Box" – 3:24

References

External links
 

1992 debut singles
1992 songs
Interscope Records singles
No Doubt songs
Songs about television
Songs written by Eric Stefani
Songs written by Gwen Stefani
Songs written by Tom Dumont
Songs written by Tony Kanal